The Dominican Summer Angels are a minor league baseball team in the Dominican Summer League. The team plays in the Boca Chica North division and is affiliated with the Los Angeles Angels.

History
The team came into existence in 1989, and has mostly been an independent Angels affiliate ever since.  There have been a few exceptions.  For the 1991 season, the team shared an affiliation with the Los Angeles Dodgers and San Diego Padres.  In 1994, they were a split squad: one independent team and one shared affiliation with the Dodgers.  The team shared an affiliation with the Tampa Bay Devil Rays for the 1996 season, then ceased operations for one season in 1997.  They resumed operations in 1998, sharing an affiliation with the Chicago White Sox.  They have been independently affiliated since 1999.

Roster

References

External links
DSL Angels on SABR Minor Leagues Database

Baseball teams in the Dominican Republic
Dominican Summer League teams
Los Angeles Angels minor league affiliates
Los Angeles Angels of Anaheim minor league affiliates
Anaheim Angels minor league affiliates
California Angels minor league affiliates